Redcar and Cleveland Borough Council is the local authority for the unitary authority of Redcar and Cleveland in North Yorkshire, England. Until 1 April 1996 it was a non-metropolitan district in Cleveland, called Langbaurgh (or Langbaurgh-on-Tees after 1988).

Political control
Since the first election to the council in 1973 political control of the council has been held by the following parties:

Langbaurgh non-metropolitan district

Redcar and Cleveland unitary authority

Leadership
The leaders of the council since 2007 have been:

Council elections

Non-metropolitan district elections
1973 Langbaurgh Borough Council election
1976 Langbaurgh Borough Council election (New ward boundaries)
1979 Langbaurgh Borough Council election
1983 Langbaurgh Borough Council election
1987 Langbaurgh Borough Council election
1991 Langbaurgh-on-Tees Borough Council election (New ward boundaries)

Unitary authority elections
1995 Redcar and Cleveland Borough Council election
1999 Redcar and Cleveland Borough Council election
2003 Redcar and Cleveland Borough Council election (New ward boundaries)
2007 Redcar and Cleveland Borough Council election
2011 Redcar and Cleveland Borough Council election
2015 Redcar and Cleveland Borough Council election
2019 Redcar and Cleveland Borough Council election (New ward boundaries)
2023 Redcar and Cleveland Borough Council election (Upcoming)

Borough result maps

By-election results

1995–1999

1999–2003

2003–2007

2007–2011

2011–2015

2015–2019

2019-2023

References

External links
Redcar and Cleveland Borough Council
By-election results

 
Council elections in North Yorkshire
Redcar and Cleveland
Unitary authority elections in England
Council elections in Cleveland